The Golden Bull is a Dutch prize in the world of brokers since 2007. The choice for the bull as a symbol is easy, since it also represents a rising exchange, which therefore is also called a bullmarket.
Since the adding of a jury, the price has got more esteem with professional traders. The press also noticed and on special broker and trading websites there has been more and more attention towards the issue of the Golden Bull award.

Categories 
On annual basis, there are prizes in different categories. In 2015 these categories were: best broker, best trade innovation, best fund, best ETF, Green Bull (best sustainable fund), best mixfund-range, best asset en best trade-expert. The winners of the categories are chosen by a jury, except for the people choice award for best trade-expert.

Organisation and jury 
Since 2015, the Golden Bull award has been hosted by the biggest broker websites in The Netherlands: IEX.nl, Belegger.nl, DeBeurs.nl, EuroBench.com en BeursOnline. Before that the organization of the event was in hands of Belegger.nl. This website was in hands of the Dutch company Sanoma Media until 2015 and is now in hands of Value8 of former chairman of the Vereniging van Effectenbezitters, Peter Paul de Vries.
In the first few years the winners of the award were determined by public vote. The last few years the public vote made place for a jury with specialists from the trading world.

Winners

2018

2014

2013

References

Business and industry awards
Awards established in 2007
2007 establishments in the Netherlands